Danial Mahini is an Iranian football defender who plays for Esteghlal Khuzestan in the Persian Gulf Pro League.

Club career

Mahini started his career with Iranjavan as a youth player. He advanced to the first team in 2012. In summer 2015 he joined Esteghlal Khuzestan with a 2-year contract. He made his debut for Esteghlal Khuzestan on July 30, 2015 against Sepahan as a starter.

Club career statistics

International career
He made his debut on 7 June 2016 against Kyrgyzstan in Azadi Stadium in Tehran in a Friendly.

Honours 
Esteghlal Khuzestan
Persian Gulf Pro League (1): 2015–16
Iranian Super Cup runner-up: 2016

References

External links
 Danial Mahini at PersianLeague.com
 Danial Mahini at IranLeague.ir

1993 births
Living people
People from Bushehr
Iranian footballers
Association football fullbacks
Iranjavan players
Esteghlal Khuzestan players
21st-century Iranian people